The 1991 Brownlow Medal was the 64th year the award was presented to the player adjudged the fairest and best player during the Australian Football League (AFL) home and away season. Jim Stynes of the Melbourne Football Club was declared the outright winner of the medal count, becoming the fifth individual to win the award while playing for Melbourne.

Top 10 votegetters
If a number is vacant, it indicates that the player missed that particular game.
Numbers highlighted in blue indicates the player led/were equal leader in the Brownlow Medal count at the end of that round.
Players with asterisks next to names indicates ineligibility to win the award due to suspension from the Tribunal.

Leading votegetters by club

References

External links
 
 

Brownlow Medal
1991
1991 Australian Football League season